Arginine 2-monooxygenase is an enzyme that catalyzes the chemical reaction

L-arginine + O2  4-guanidinobutanamide + CO2 + H2O

Thus, the two substrates of this enzyme are L-arginine and oxygen, whereas its 3 products are 4-guanidinobutanamide, carbon dioxide, and water.

This enzyme belongs to the family of oxidoreductases, specifically those acting on single donors with O2 as oxidant and incorporation of two atoms of oxygen into the substrate (oxygenases). The oxygen incorporated need not be derived from O with incorporation of one atom of oxygen (internal monooxygenases o internal mixed-function oxidases).  The systematic name of this enzyme class is L-arginine:oxygen 2-oxidoreductase (decarboxylating). Other names in common use include arginine monooxygenase, arginine decarboxylase, arginine oxygenase (decarboxylating), and arginine decarboxy-oxidase.  This enzyme participates in urea cycle and metabolism of amino groups.  It has one cofactor: the flavin FAD.

References

 
 
 

EC 1.13.12
Flavoproteins
Enzymes of unknown structure